Duck hunting is an outdoor recreational activity practised under a permit system in the Australian state of South Australia. Licensed shooters hunt using shotguns and dogs, and are provided with permits issued by the Department of Environment and Water on payment of a fee and completion of a Waterfowl Identification Test. Permits are available to persons 14 years of age and older for an annual fee of $43.25 or $22.40 for children or concession holders. The activity is opposed by animal welfare groups who consider the practice to be unacceptably cruel.

Origins 
Duck hunting using firearms has occurred in South Australia since the formal establishment of the colony in the early 19th century. Since that time, some aboriginal hunters adapted their traditional practice to make use of the newly available firearms. In 1918, Henry Galway, the Governor of South Australia said that he had hunted ducks every year since he arrived in South Australia. He also advocated for the implementation of a closed season including the month of January in order to prevent the killing of young ducks during the animals' breeding season.

During the 19th and 20th centuries, duck hunting was frequently referred to as "sport" and its participants referred to as "sportsmen"- though the activity has its origins in the obtaining of meat for human consumption. In the colony's "early days" the magpie goose (Anseranas semipalmata) was prized for its meat and was hunted "to practical extinction". Several other species have been removed from lists of species permitted to be hunted as their populations have fallen, including Latham's snipe and several species of duck.

Duck hunting is considered to be a particularly safe activity (from the hunter's perspective) due to the absence of large predatory animals in South Australia. The greatest risk a hunter faces is posed by fellow hunters and their firearms.

Species hunted 

As of 2016, the hunting of six native species of ducks is permitted: the Australian wood duck or Maned duck (Chenonetta jubata), Grey teal (Anas gracilis), Chestnut teal (Anas castanea), Pink-eared duck (Malacorhynchus membranaceus), Pacific black duck (Anas superciliosa) and Mountain duck or Australian shelduck (Tadorna tadornoides). The introduced Mallard is also allowed to be hunted.

Species formerly allowed to be hunted include the Australasian shoveler (Anas rhynchotis) and the Hardhead (Aythya (Nyroca) australis). Prior to 1976, Latham's snipe (Gallinago hardwickii) was allowed to be hunted. As of 2016, Latham's snipe and the Australasian shoveler are listed as Rare under the National Parks and Wildlife Act 1972. The Hardhead is listed as Vulnerable under Victorian legislation.

Season 
Duck hunting open seasons in South Australia have typically started in February or March and ended in late June.

In the 1920s, the unusually early opening of the season in December, which overlapped with duck breeding season, became a subject of public controversy. Concerns were raised that parent birds would be killed while their young were still dependent on them, leading to their chicks dying of starvation.

In 1946, the season commenced on 14 February and ended on 30 June. In 1982, the season commenced on 27 February and ended on 26 June. In 1992, the season commenced on 14 February and ended on 15 June.

In 1948, 400 hunters shot an estimated 3,500 ducks in the Tatiara district in a single morning. In 1954, over 600 hunters attended the season opening in the Naracoorte district, including "hundreds" from the neighbouring state of  Victoria.

The 2016 duck hunting season commenced on 19 March and will conclude on 26 June. Hunting in some game reserves is only permitted on weekends.

Conditions 
As of 2016, hunters must have passed a Waterfowl Identification Test before being allowed to hunt ducks in South Australia. Ducks are only to be hunted during limited open seasons. The killing of unlisted or protected species is prohibited. Current permits must be carried by hunters at all times while hunting. The pre-feeding of hunting grounds is prohibited as is the taking of eggs of any species. Hunters must not damage vegetation or disturb animals' burrows or nests. Duck shooting is prohibited from moving boats.

Bag limits 
As of 2016, a bag limit of five ducks per hunter per day exists. Historically, bag limits were greater.

In 1927, a "sportsman" was permitted to shoot 25 ducks per day, and up to 40 quail per day on a single hunting license. A professional license was also available, which allowed a hunter to kill an unlimited number of ducks. At that time, in the neighbouring state of Victoria, the only available license limited each hunter to 15 ducks per day. Recreational hunters were also prohibited from selling hunted ducks commercially. No such sale limitation was in place in South Australia, which allowed for South Australian duck hunters, professional and recreational, to export ducks to Victoria for sale there. The allowance for "market shooters" was considered to be risking populations of ducks being "wiped out" from some areas in 1928.

In 1946, the bag limit was 12 ducks "per gun" per day. The bag limit was also 12 ducks per hunter per day in 1992, with a further restriction of a maximum of two Australasian shoveller per day.

Fees 
As of 2016, duck hunting permits cost $43.25 for adults and $22.40 for children and concession holders. In 1982, the equivalent permit cost $12.

Firearms 

Ducks may only be shot using "a smoothbore firearm that has a bore not exceeding 1.9cm (12 gauge) firing shot no larger than BB (4.1mm in diameter)." Pump action and self-loading firearms are prohibited unless used on private land.

In 1940, duck hunters visiting South Australia from other states were required to register their firearms in South Australia and purchase a gun license for 5 shillings. In 1943, the Commonwealth Government considered banning duck hunting for the year in order to conserve ammunition during Australia's involvement in World War II.

Compliance 
Hunters must comply with the Code of Practice for the Humane Destruction of Birds by Shooting in South Australia, the National Parks and Wildlife Act 1972, the National Parks and Wildlife (Hunting) Regulations 2011 and the Animal Welfare Act 1985.

Locations 
Duck hunting is authorized to occur during certain days and times in the following South Australian game reserves: Chowilla, Moorook, Loch Luna, Currency Creek, Lake Robe, Mud Islands, Poocher Swamp, Tolderol, Bucks Lake  and Bool Lagoon.

Opposition 
Objections to the management and practises of duck hunting in South Australia have been expressed publicly since at least the 1920s.

In the 1940s, attention was drawn to lax enforcement of a protected area known as Bird Island at Lake Bonney in the south east of the state, and to hunters' use of "automatic" weapons.

In 1990, Laurie Levy from Animal Liberation Victoria described South Australia as having "some of the most draconian duck hunting laws still in Australia."

In the 2010s, organisations opposing duck hunting in South Australia include Protect Our Native Ducks Inc. (POND), the RSPCA, the Australian Greens and the Animal Justice Party.

References 

Environment of South Australia
Animal welfare and rights in Australia
Hunting in Australia